Kolotl is a genus of scorpions in the family Diplocentridae, native to Mexico. Named for the Nahuatl word for scorpion, they can be almost 10cm long.

Species 
Currently accepted species include:
Kolotl magnus (Beutelspacher & López-Forment, 1991)
Kolotl poncei (Francke & Quijano-Ravell, 2009)

References

Diplocentridae
Scorpion genera